The Long Dark Hall is a 1951 British mystery, suspense, courtroom-drama, crime film directed by Reginald Beck and Anthony Bushell and starring Rex Harrison, Lilli Palmer and Raymond Huntley. It was based on the 1947  novel A Case to Answer by Edgar Lustgarten. It was made at Walton Studios.

Plot
After a showgirl begins an affair with Arthur Groome, a married man, she is found murdered.  Groome discovers her body but fearing his wife's knowledge of his affair he does not summon the police; he soon becomes the prime suspect for the murder. Most of the film portrays the trial of Groome at the Old Bailey, London.

Cast

 Rex Harrison - Arthur Groome 
 Lilli Palmer - Mary Groome 
 Tania Heald - Sheila Groome 
 Henrietta Barry - Rosemary Groome 
 Dora Sevening - Mary's mother 
 Ronald Simpson - Mary's father 
 Raymond Huntley - Chief Inspector Sullivan 
 William Squire - Sergeant Cochran 
 Ballard Berkeley - Superintendent Maxey
 Anthony Dawson -  The Man 
 Denis O'Dea -  Sir Charles Morton 
 Anthony Bushell -  Clive Bedford 
 Henry B. Longhurst -  Judge
 Patricia Cutts - Rose Mallory 
 Meriel Forbes - Marjorie Danns 
 Brenda De Banzie - Mrs Rogers 
 Douglas Jefferies - Dr. Conway 
 Fletcher Lightfoot - Jury Foreman 
 Anthony Shaw - Clerk of the Court 
 Michael Medwin - Leslie Scott 
 Colin Gordon - Pound
 Lionel Murton - Jefferson (US version only)
 Eric Pohlmann - Mr Polaris 
 Lilli Molnar - Mrs Polaris  
 Frank Tickle - Alfred Tripp 
 Tom Macaulay - Ironworks manager 
 Richard Littledale - Mr Sims 
 Jenny Laird - Mrs Sims
 Tony Quinn -  Joe the barman
 Jill Bennett -  First murdered girl

Critical reception
In The New York Times, Bosley Crowther wrote, "a very tidy murder drama arrived yesterday from England at the Rivoli Theater...An unusually literate and impressively acted film...It is English in setting and temperament, but international in its entertainment appeal. Thoughtful audiences should especially welcome this picture."

References

External links

1951 films
1950s English-language films
1951 crime films
Films directed by Reginald Beck
Films directed by Anthony Bushell
Films based on British novels
British crime films
British black-and-white films
Films scored by Benjamin Frankel
Films set in London
Films shot at Nettlefold Studios
1950s British films